Edelweiss is a 43-story residential high-rise in Moscow, completed in 2003.

Overview
The building was designed to be a companion for the Seven Sisters and shares a similar design concept with Triumph-Palace. Edelweiss is the first project in "The New Circle of Moscow" program, in which about sixty high rise multi-use residential complexes will be built on plots around the city which were approved by the Moscow Architecture Committee.

Facilities
Recreational facilities include an aquapark equipped with hydromassage tubs, waterslides, a solarium, a universal gymnasium, a ten-track bowling center, and billiards rooms.

References

External links

Residential buildings completed in 2003
Residential skyscrapers in Moscow